Cheyenne Township, Kansas may refer to:

 Cheyenne Township, Barton County, Kansas
 Cheyenne Township, Lane County, Kansas

See also 
 List of Kansas townships
 Cheyenne Township (disambiguation)

Kansas township disambiguation pages